Twenty-two people are recorded as having produced fictional films in the Dutch East Indies between 1926, when L. Heuveldorp released Loetoeng Kasaroeng, the colony's first domestically produced film, and 1949, when the Dutch formally recognised Indonesia's sovereignty after a four-year revolution, leaving the Dutch East Indies defunct. Altogether, they are credited for 93 of all known films produced in the Indies, and four of them remained active after independence. All were men; the first female film producer in Indonesia, Ratna Asmara, produced her first film in 1953.

The colony's first producer, Heuveldorp, was of European descent. He was followed in 1928 by the ethnic Chinese businessmen Tjan Tjoen Lian and Liem Goan Lian, who began work on Lily van Java but soon pulled out, to be replaced by David Wong. By 1930 Chinese producers had dominated the industry. The most active of these, The Teng Chun, made his debut in 1931 with Boenga Roos dari Tjikembang; he would go on to produce another 27 films before independence. No native Indonesian film producers are recorded from this period, although several productions were credited only to companies.

Producers in the Indies would often handle multiple roles, such as director and cinematographer. When these positions were filled separately, the producer retained creative control. The Indonesian film historian Misbach Yusa Biran writes that works produced during this time were emphatically commercial, not paying attention to nationalistic or aesthetic values. However, the film scholars Thomas Barker and Charlotte Setijadi-Dunn suggest that the Chinese-produced films from the Indies offered the possibility of a heterogeneous national identity.

The following list is sorted alphabetically by default, with further sorting capability in certain fields; owing to differing naming conventions between cultures, not all entries are sorted by last name. The list only counts fictional films directed by the subjects and does not include films from other genres or films in which the person held other roles. The names of persons credited with an abbreviated name are written in full, where available.


Film producers

Explanatory notes

Footnotes

Works cited

 
 
 
 
 
 
 
 
 
 
 
 
 
 
 
 
 
 
 
 
 
 
 
 
 
 

Dutch East Indies